This is a list of the heads of the modern Bulgarian state, from the establishment of the Principality of Bulgaria to the present day.

It also lists the general secretaries of the Bulgarian Communist Party in 1948–1990. From 1948 onwards, the general secretary was the country's de facto chief executive.

Principality of Bulgaria (1878–1908)

Kingdom of Bulgaria (1908–1946)

People's Republic of Bulgaria (1946–1990)

Status

General Secretaries of the Bulgarian Communist Party (1948–1990)

Republic of Bulgaria (1990–present)

Timeline from 1946

Head of state titles

See also
 Politics of Bulgaria
 List of Bulgarian monarchs
 List of Bulgarian regents
 List of heads of government of Bulgaria
 List of presidents of Bulgaria (1990-present)
 List of first deputy chairmen of the State Council of Bulgaria
 Vice President of Bulgaria

Notes

External links
 List of Bulgarian heads of state and government
 The President of the Republic of Bulgaria
 King Simeon

Bulgaria

Heads of state